Juliana Riva Baroni (born 18 April 1978) is a Brazilian actress and singer. She is best known for being a paquita (Xuxa's stage assistant) for five years and for her leading role on the Rede Bandeirantes telenovela Dance, Dance, Dance.

Career
Baroni started her television career in February 1990 as a stage assistant (paquita) to Xuxa on Rede Globo's children's television series Xou da Xuxa. She was a paquita for five years. During that time, she recorded an album with the other paquitas, besides being a backing vocal on Xuxa's records. She left the program in 1995 when Xuxa replaced all of her Paquitas with new ones.

After her departure from the show, she started her acting career, starring on the Globo telenovelas Cara e Coroa, Salsa e Merengue, Malhação, Uga-Uga, A Lua Me Disse and O Profeta. She also starred on the Portuguese telenovela A Senhora das Águas, aired on RTP.

On 2006, she remembered the time she was a paquita on a special program aired on Globo to celebrate the 20th anniversary of Xuxa's career. On the same year, she acted on the film Polaróides Urbanas, directed by Miguel Falabella. On the following year, she gained her first leading role on Rede Bandeirantes' telenovela Dance, Dance, Dance.

Juliana Baroni replaced Juliana Paes in the role of Ulla in the musical play The Producers, adapted by Falabella. The playwright compared her beauty to Scarlett Johansson's. Baroni also portrays Marisa Letícia Lula da Silva, First Lady of Brazil, in the film Lula, o filho do Brasil.

Filmography

Film
2008: Lula, o filho do Brasil as Dona Marisa Letícia
2006: Polaróides Urbanas as Vanessa
2002: Xuxa e os Duendes 2 - No Caminho das Fadas as Kin
1991: Gaúcho Negro
1990: Lua de Cristal
1990: Sonho de Verão

Television
2015:  Cúmplices de um Resgate  as Rebeca Agnes
2010: Ribeirão do Tempo as Karina Santos
2009: Cilada as Mulher Chiclete
2008: Toma Lá, Dá Cá as Louquinha Albuquerque
2007: Dance, Dance, Dance as Sofia Ivanitch
2006: O Profeta as Miriam
2006: A Grande Família as Daniela
2005: A Lua Me Disse as Soraya
2003: Celebridade as Sônia
2000: Uga-Uga as Sheeva Maria
2001: A Senhora das Águas as Cláudia Cardoso Lobo
1998: Malhação as Cacau
1997: Você Decide as Bárbara
1996: Salsa e Merengue as Inês
1995: Cara e Coroa as Júlia
1995: Xuxa Park as Catuxa
1990: Xou da Xuxa as Jujuba

Discography
Albums
2007: Dance, Dance, Dance soundtrack

Singles
2007: "Dance, Dance, Dance"

References

External links

1978 births
Living people
People from Limeira
Brazilian people of Italian descent
Brazilian film actresses
Brazilian television actresses
Actresses from São Paulo (state)
20th-century Brazilian actresses
21st-century Brazilian actresses
21st-century Brazilian singers
21st-century Brazilian women singers